Goldwin may refer to:

Surname
Kyle Goldwin (born 1985), Gilbatarian footballer
Robert Goldwin (1922–2010), American political scientist
William Goldwin (c. 1682–1747), English schoolteacher and vicar

First name
Goldwin Corlett Elgie (1896–1975), Canadian lawyer and politician
Goldwin Smith (1823–1910), British historian and journalist

Middle name
Hugh Goldwin Rivière (1869–1956), British portraitist
William Goldwin Carrington Howland (1915–1994), Canadian lawyer and judge

See also
Goldwin's law, Internet adage
Goldwind, a Chinese multinational wind turbine manufacturer
Goldwing (disambiguation)
Goldwyn
Goodwin (disambiguation)